Sérika Mitchell Gulumá Ortiz (born 16 July 1990) is a Colombian racing cyclist, who rides for Colombian amateur team . She competed in the 2013 UCI women's team time trial in Florence.

Major results

Road

2008
 2nd  Time trial, Pan American Road Championships
2009
 3rd Time trial, National Road Championships
2010
 1st Overall Vuelta Femenino del Porvenir
1st Stages 1, 2, 4 (ITT) & 5
 3rd Overall Clasica Alcaldia de Anapoima
 3rd Overall Vuelta a Cundinamarca
 4th Road race, South American Games
 4th Road race, National Road Championships
2011
 1st  Overall Tour Femenino de Colombia
1st Stage 2
 1st Overall Vuelta Femenino del Porvenir
1st Stage 2
 2nd Overall Vuelta a Cundinamarca
 3rd  Team pursuit, Pan American Games (with María Luisa Calle and Lorena Vargas)
 National Road Championships
4th Road race
4th Time trial
 5th Overall Clasica Alcaldia de Anapoima
2012
 3rd Overall Tour Femenino de Colombia
1st Stages 1, 3 & 4
 3rd Overall Vuelta Femenino del Porvenir
1st Stages 1, 3 (ITT) & 4
 9th Overall Vuelta a Cundinamarca
 9th Herman Miller Grand Cycling Classic
2013
 National Road Championships
1st  Time trial
5th Road race
 3rd  Time trial, Pan American Road Championships
 3rd Overall Vuelta a El Salvador
 5th Grand Prix de Oriente
 10th Grand Prix GSB
2014
 1st  Time trial, National Road Championships
 2nd  Time trial, Central American and Caribbean Games
 2nd  Time trial, Pan American Road Championships
 4th Overall Vuelta Internacional Femenina a Costa Rica
 4th Overall Tour Femenino de San Luis
 9th Giro dell'Emilia Internazionale Donne Elite
2015
 National Road Championships
2nd Time trial
6th Road race
 2nd Overall Vuelta al Valle del Cauca
 3rd Overall Vuelta Femenino del Porvenir
 6th Giro del Trentino Alto Adige-Südtirol
2016
 1st  Road race, Pan American Road Championships
 1st Overall Vuelta Al Tolima
1st Stages 2 & 3
 National Road Championships
2nd Time trial
8th Road race
 2nd Overall Clasica Alcaldia de Anapoima
2017
 5th Overall Vuelta a Boyacá
 5th Overall Vuelta Femenino del Porvenir
2018
 1st  Time trial, National Road Championships
 1st Stage 4 Vuelta a Colombia Femenina
 South American Games
2nd  Time trial
3rd  Road race
 3rd  Time trial, Central American and Caribbean Games
2019
 1st  Time trial, National Road Championships
 1st Stage 3 Vuelta a Colombia Femenina
2021
 1st  Time trial, National Road Championships
 5th Time trial, Pan American Road Championships
2022
 2nd  Time trial, Bolivarian Games
 4th Overall Vuelta Internacional Femenina a Costa Rica
1st Points classification

Track

2010
 Central American and Caribbean Games
1st  Team pursuit (with María Luisa Calle and Leidy Muñoz)
2nd  Points race
2nd  Omnium
 3rd  Individual pursuit, South American Games
2011
 3rd  Team pursuit, Pan American Games (with María Luisa Calle and Lorena Vargas)
 3rd  Team pursuit, Pan American Track Championships
2013
 2nd  Team pursuit, Pan American Track Championships (with María Luisa Calle and Milena Salcedo)
2018
 1st  Team pursuit, South American Games
 2nd  Team pursuit, Central American and Caribbean Games
 2nd Points race, National Track Championships
2022
 3rd  Team pursuit, UCI Track Cycling Nations Cup, Cali

References

External links

1990 births
Living people
Colombian female cyclists
People from Calarcá
Pan American Games bronze medalists for Colombia
Cyclists at the 2011 Pan American Games
Pan American Games medalists in cycling
Central American and Caribbean Games gold medalists for Colombia
Central American and Caribbean Games silver medalists for Colombia
South American Games bronze medalists for Colombia
South American Games medalists in cycling
Competitors at the 2010 South American Games
Competitors at the 2010 Central American and Caribbean Games
Central American and Caribbean Games medalists in cycling
Medalists at the 2011 Pan American Games
21st-century Colombian women
Competitors at the 2014 Central American and Caribbean Games
Competitors at the 2018 Central American and Caribbean Games